Group A of the 1999 Fed Cup Asia/Oceania Zone Group II was one of two pools in the Asia/Oceania Zone Group II of the 1999 Fed Cup. Three teams competed in a round robin competition, with the top two teams qualifying for the play-offs.

Kazakhstan vs. Malaysia

Singapore vs. Kazakhstan

Singapore vs. Malaysia

See also
Fed Cup structure

References

External links
 Fed Cup website

1999 Fed Cup Asia/Oceania Zone